Liolà is a 1963 Italian comedy film directed by Alessandro Blasetti. It is based on Liolà, a comedy play by Luigi Pirandello.

The film was released as A Very Handy Man in the U.S. in 1966.

Plot summary 
In late-nineteenth-century Sicily, the wealthy Zia Croce has a large, successful farm, which she runs with her cousin, Zio Simone. He is married to Mita, and is downcast because they do not have a son to inherit the farm. Zia Croce also has a daughter, who wants a son of her own for the same reason. Their situations are apparently solved, but actually complicated, by the appearance of Liola, whose seductive powers are put by both women to practical use.

Cast 
Ugo Tognazzi: Liolà
Giovanna Ralli: Tuzza Azzara
Anouk Aimée: Mita
Pierre Brasseur: Zio Simone Palumbo
Elisa Cegani: Cesa
Dolores Palumbo: Zia Croce
Umberto Spadaro 
Graziella Granata

References

External links

1963 films
Italian historical comedy films
1960s Italian-language films
1960s historical comedy films
Films directed by Alessandro Blasetti
Films set in Sicily
Italian films based on plays
Films based on works by Luigi Pirandello
Films set in the 19th century
1963 comedy films
1960s Italian films